{{Album ratings
| ADM       = 7.6/10
| MC        = 82/100
| rev1      = AllMusic
| rev1score = 
| rev2      = Clash
| rev2score = 7/10
| rev3      = The Line of Best Fit
| rev3score = 8/10
| rev4      = Mojo
| rev4score = 
| rev5      = MusicOMH| rev5score = 
| rev6      = Pitchfork| rev6score = 7.8/10
| rev7      = The Observer| rev7score = 
| noprose   = yes
}}Head Above the Water is the third  studio album by Irish singer-songwriter Brigid Mae Power. It was released on 5 June 2020 under Fire Records.

The first single from the album "Wedding of a Friend" was released on 7 April 2020.

Critical receptionHead Above the Water'' was met with "universal acclaim" reviews from critics. At Metacritic, which assigns a weighted average rating out of 100 to reviews from mainstream publications, this release received an average score of 82, based on 8 reviews. Aggregator Album of the Year gave the album a 79 out of 100 based on a critical consensus of 9 reviews. AnyDecentMusic? gave the release 7.6 out of 10.

Track listing

Personnel

Musicians
 Brigid Mae Power – Lead vocals (producer
 Liam Chapman – drums
 Brian MacGloinn – Violin, vocals

Production
 Samuel Smith – engineer
 Brian Pyle – mastering
 Alasdair Roberts – producer
 Peter Broderick – producer

References

2020 albums
Fire Records (UK) albums